John Heilman is an American municipal politician in West Hollywood, California.

John Heilman may also refer to:
 John Heileman (1872–1940), American professional baseball player
 John Heilemann (born 1966), American journalist and national-affairs analyst
 John B. Heilman (1920–2013), American politician in South Dakota

See also
Heilman
Heilmann